Deplanchea is a genus of about eight species of tropical rainforest trees, constituting part of the plant family Bignoniaceae.

They grow naturally in New Guinea, New Caledonia, Borneo, Sumatra, Malay Peninsula, central Sulawesi and north eastern Australia.

Species
 The Plant List recognises 8 accepted species:
 Deplanchea bancana  – Sumatra, Borneo, Malay Peninsula, Riau Archipelago, Bangka Island, Belitung
 Deplanchea coriacea 
 Deplanchea glabra  – New Guinea, C. Sulawesi, E. Borneo
 Deplanchea hirsuta 
 Deplanchea montana 
 Deplanchea sessilifolia  – New Caledonia endemic
 Deplanchea speciosa  – New Caledonia endemic
 Deplanchea tetraphylla  – New Guinea, Aru Islands, north eastern Queensland and Cape York Peninsula, Australia

References

Cited works

External links
 Deplanchea photographs in Flickr

Bignoniaceae
Bignoniaceae genera
Taxa named by Eugène Vieillard